The list of ship launches in 1793 includes a chronological list of some ships launched in 1793.


References

1793
Ship launches